Mangelia dunkeri is a species of sea snail, a marine gastropod mollusk in the family Mangeliidae.

Description
The length of the shell attains 10 mm.

Distribution
This marine species occurs off Japan, Korea and the Philippines.

References

External links
  Tucker, J.K. 2004 Catalog of recent and fossil turrids (Mollusca: Gastropoda). Zootaxa 682:1–1295.
 

dunkeri
Gastropods described in 1961